Qabaq Tappeh (also Romanized as Qābāq Tappeh and Qabāq Tappeh; also known as Oabākh Tappeh, Qabāy Tappeh, and Qapāq Tappeh) is a village in Sanjabi Rural District, Kuzaran District, Kermanshah County, Kermanshah Province, Iran. According to the 2006 Census, 139 people lived there in 31 families.

References 

Populated places in Kermanshah County